Southport Division may refer to:
 Southport (UK Parliament constituency)
 Southport Division, Queensland, a former local government area in Australia